George Carroll is the name of:

 George Washington Carroll (1855–1935), Presidential election running mate in 1904
 George Carroll (ice hockey) (1897–1939), Canadian hockey player
 George Carroll (judge) (1922–2016), American politician, activist and jurist
 George Carroll (instrument maker) (1902–1983), American astronomical instrument maker
 Slaine (2000s–2020s), American rapper and actor (birth name)

See also 
  144633 Georgecarroll asteroid named after the instrument maker